is a Japanese law that was passed in June 1978 and came into effect in December 1978.

The Act put into place an integrated set of measures and created several bodies at national, prefecture and local levels. These bodies dealt with preparation and response to earthquakes, including the establishment of a National Headquarters for Earthquake Disaster Prevention. It also includes a mechanism under which the Director General of the Meteorological Agency alerts the Prime Minister of a predicted impending earthquake, so that warnings can be issued.

See also
Coordinating Committee for Earthquake Prediction

References

Japanese legislation
1978 in law
Earthquake and seismic risk mitigation